Gamchen is a complex volcano located in the southeastern part of the Kamchatka Peninsula, Russia. It is composed of four stratovolcanoes.

See also
 List of volcanoes in Russia
 List of ultras of Northeast Asia

References

External links
 "Gora Gamchen, Russia" on Peakbagger

Complex volcanoes
Mountains of the Kamchatka Peninsula
Volcanoes of the Kamchatka Peninsula
Stratovolcanoes of Russia
Pleistocene stratovolcanoes
Holocene stratovolcanoes